Bonham State Park is a  state park located in Bonham, Texas (in Fannin County, northeast of Dallas). It includes a  lake, rolling prairies, and woodlands.

History

The state acquired the land for the park in 1933 from the City of Bonham. Civilian Conservation Corps Company 894 developed the park between 1933 and 1936, landscaping the rocky, hilly terrain for erosion control and recreational purposes, and constructing an earthen dam to impound a sixty-five-acre lake. They constructed buildings of local cream-colored limestone and Eastern red cedar, working under the supervision of Bonham architect Joe C. Lair and San Antonio architect William C. Caldwell. The overall design exhibits a rustic style.

The CCC also built the entrance portal, concession building (currently the park headquarters and storage facility), waterfront storage building (currently the boat house), pavilion and dance terrace, picnic tables, barbecue pits, water fountains, vehicle and foot bridges, culverts and a water tower.

Activities

There is (unsupervised) swimming and fishing in the lake as well as camping, picnicking, mountain biking, boating (5 mph speed limit).

Area Attractions

Nearby attractions include the Eisenhower State park, Eisenhower Birthplace and Sam Bell Maxey House State Historic Sites. Bonham attractions include the Sam Rayburn Museum and the Sam Rayburn House Museum, both named in honor of Sam Rayburn. Rayburn was a Fannin County native who held the office of U.S. Speaker of the House for 17 years, the longest tenure in U.S. history.

Campsites & Other Facilities

Facilities include restrooms with and without showers; picnic sites (including one group picnic area); campsites with water and electricity; campsites with water; a group camp with barracks and a dining hall, which accommodates approximately 94 people (the facility is only rented as a single unit, not separately); an  trail for mountain biking and hiking; a playground; a launching ramp; a boat dock; and a lighted fishing pier.

Natural Features

The park is situated in the Texas blackland prairies. The terrain is dominated by grassland interspersed by woodlands. More luxuriant woodlands occur along water courses and the lake's shoreline. Although the park's grasslands are no longer pristine, they are recovering nicely and have small areas dominated by little bluestem and bushy bluestem. The woodlands are composed of Texas live oak, eastern red cedar, bois d'arc, and Eve's Necklace, with sugarberry, cottonwood, black willow, and green ash becoming more common along the creeks and lake shore. Numerous wildflowers and flowering shrubs cover the gently rolling prairie in the spring, and stands of cedar and mixed hardwoods provide a panorama of multicolored leaves in the fall. Wildlife is limited because of the relatively small size of the park. However, the lake shoreline provides habitats for beaver, raccoon, opossum, and a number of visiting songbirds. Although a few woodland birds are permanent residents, visitor and migrant species outnumber the residents.

References

Grasslands of Texas
Protected areas of Fannin County, Texas
State parks of Texas